Alone in Damascus is the story of Eli Cohen, a former Israeli spy.
This book was describes the life and death of Eli Cohen.

In 1986, the book was first published in Hebrew in Herzliya. In 2012, the revised edition of this book was published.
In 1997, the book was translated from Hebrew to Arabic. In 1997, the book was translated from Arabic to Persian.

See also
Human rights in ISIL-controlled territory

References

1986 non-fiction books
Israeli biographies
Hebrew-language books